Agogo may refer to
Agogo, Ghana
Agogô, a musical instrument
Agogo (album), by KMFDM

See also
Junior Agogo (1979–2019), Ghanaian footballer
À gogo (disambiguation), multiple term deriving from a French expression meaning "in abundance, galore"